SAQ or Saq may refer to:

 the callsign of the Grimeton VLF transmitter near Varberg, Sweden
 Saky, a city in the Crimea, Russia, also romanized as "Saq"
 Soluble anthraquinone
 the Self Assessment Questionnaire for the Payment Card Industry Data Security Standard (PCI DSS)
 Saq, Markazi, a village in Iran
 Saq, Razavi Khorasan, a village in Iran
 Some Answered Questions, Baháʼí text